Corniche (foaled February 17, 2019) is a retired Champion American thoroughbred racehorse who, as a two-year-old, won the American Pharoah Stakes and Breeders' Cup Juvenile.

Background
Corniche is a bay colt that was bred in Kentucky by Bart Evans and Stonehaven Steadings. His sire is Quality Road and his dam is Wasted Tears who was sired by Najran. He is the second black-type horse out of his dam, a multiple graded stakes winner who excelled in routes on turf. Her first black-type performer is the stakes-placed Coffee Crush (by Medaglia d'Oro), who died in 2019. All six of the dam's foals to start are winners.

Initially, Corniche was placed in the 2020 Keeneland Association September Yearling Sale but his reserve price of $350,000 was not met. Later he was bought for $1,500,000 by Speedway Stables, a partnership of Peter Fluor and Kane C. Weiner at the 2021 Ocala Breeders' Sales Spring Sale of Two-Year-Olds in Training. Corniche was trained by Bob Baffert and his jockey is Mike E. Smith in 2021. However, his owners sent the colt to trainer Todd Pletcher in 2022 after Bob Baffert was suspended.

Racing career

2021: two-year-old season

Corniche began his career on 4 September 2021 at Del Mar Racetrack in a Maiden Special Weight event for two-year-olds over a distance of five and one-half furlongs facing nine other first-starters. Corniche drew the outside barrier, nonetheless started as the 1/2 odds-on favorite crossed over from the wide barrier, took the lead leading throughout with Mike E. Smith giving an energetic hand ride inside the last furlong and drawing off to win easily by  lengths in a time of 1:03.01.

With such a commanding performance Bob Baffert entered Corniche in the Grade I American Pharoah Stakes at Santa Anita Park over a distance of one and one-sixteenth miles. On 1 October 2021, Corniche was sent of as the 2/5 odds-on faced six other entrants, took control early from the inside draw, leading the way to the far turn when stablemate Rockefeller pursued into the straight bend, Corniche kicked clear drew away under Mike E. Smith's strong handling to defeat Pappacap by  lengths in a time of 1:44.75. Smith commented after the race, "There's just so much upside to this horse. This is what's really exciting about him. When he broke his maiden as impressive as he did, he just gave me that feeling that we weren't even close to his full potential ... He's a big colt and he carries a lot of flesh.  As he starts to get even fitter and harder inside, he's gonna be a force to reckon with." By winning the American Pharoah Stakes, Corniche qualified to the Breeders' Cup since the event is a "Win and You're In" race for the GI Breeders' Cup Juvenile.
 
On 5 November 2021, Corniche started as the 7/5 favorite in the GI Breeders' Cup Juvenile at Del Mar Racetrack. Facing ten other entrants Corniche again showed his usual speed to jump out in front and dictate terms in the event. In the straight Corniche dug in, turned all challengers away, gamely winning by  lengths in a time of 1:42.50. Jockey Mike E. Smith won his 27th Breeders' Cup victory and third in the Breeders' Cup Juvenile while trainer Bob Baffert won his 18th Breeders' Cup event and fifth Breeders' Cup Juvenile. However, Corniche did not receive any qualification points for the Road to the Kentucky Derby since his trainer Bob Baffert is suspended by Churchill Downs Inc. through 2023.

2022: three-year-old season

Corniche was given time off after his two-year-old campaign, he didn't prepare fore training until mid-April at the WinStar Farm in Kentucky and missed the Triple Crown. With his original trainer Bob Baffert facing a suspension at NYRA tracks, his owners opted to send the colt to trainer Todd Pletcher for a New York campaign at Saratoga. 
Corniche made his first start in the Grade 2 Amsterdam Stakes on July 31. Corniche started as the 8/5 favorite stumbled at the start recovering inwards brushing Runninsonofagun. Then he chased four then three wide just off the top pair under coaxing from the half mile pole, faded through the turn, went four wide into upper stretch, folded, and was eased home to the finish to finish last in the nine horse field. Pletcher said, "He didn't get away cleanly and found himself in a position he's never been in before."  Through his jockey Luis Saez, Pletcher said, "When he came to the three-eighths pole, he kind of came off the bridle. We'll scope him and see if anything is revealed, but it's disappointing." It was found that Corniche shed the frog on his right front foot in the event, which likely was the cause of his last-place finish. Trainer Todd Pletcher informed that the injury will need time to heal on its own before a protective plate can be placed on it and training can resume. After a month it was announced on 28 August that Corniche was retired and would stand at Ashland Stud in 2023.

Statistics

Notes:

An (*) asterisk after the odds means Corniche was the post-time favourite.

Pedigree

References

2019 racehorse births
Racehorses bred in Kentucky
Racehorses trained in the United States
Thoroughbred family 1-x
American Grade 1 Stakes winners